Jan Mojto (born 13 May 1948 in Nitra) is a film producer and international distributor of TV- and theatre rights and operates several classical music channels in Europe.

Early career
Born in Slovakia, Mojto left for the West in the 1970s and started his career at the Kirch Group, where he was responsible for the program sector for 14 years until 2001. He was member of the supervisory boards of Mediaset/Italy, Telepiù/Italy, Gestevisión Telecinco/Spain, ProSiebenSat.1 Media AG and KirchPayTV (both Germany) and from 1994 to 2002 president of the ACT – Association of Commercial Television in Europe. Before his years at the Kirch Group, Jan Mojto worked as a journalist, specializing in film, theater and literature. Mojto, who speaks eight languages, studied literature and history in Bratislava and Munich, and obtained an MBA at the Institut Européen d'Administration des Affaires in Fontainebleau. He was honoured with the Médaille Charlemagne pour des Médias Européens (2003), the Bavarian Order of Merit (2007) and as producer the Bavarian TV Award (for Napoléon 2003) and the Austrian Film Award Romy ( 2006).

As a producer and co-producer at KirchMedia Jan Mojto was responsible for hundreds of hours of programs, and worked with actors such as Ben Kingsley, Richard Harris, Gary Oldman, John Malkovich and Gérard Depardieu, as well as with directors such as Ermanno Olmi, Roger Young, Robert Dornhelm and Florian Henckel von Donnersmarck. He focused on the filming of elaborate event programs based on historical themes and great literary works for the international market. One of his most important projects was the 21-part series based on the stories from the Bible, which achieved multiple Emmy-nominations and other awards. The miniseries Jesus with Jacqueline Bisset and Jeremy Sisto was watched by more than 24 million viewers on CBS. With Abraham, TNT reached the second highest ratings of a miniseries ever.

EOS group
His group of companies, which was set up with the founding of the television production company EOS (Events on Screen) in 2002, comprises in addition Beta Film, Beta Cinema, Kineos, Unitel and Classica. EOS develops and finances event productions with international stars for the world market. The distribution firm Beta Film with its 15.000 hours of program is one of the largest international licensors of film rights outside the U.S., the portfolio of Beta Cinema contains several Oscar-awarded movies. Kineos distributes the German-language free-TV rights to about 12,000 titles, among these are over 5,000 U.S. productions. The classical music label Unitel is the most important producer of audiovisual music recordings worldwide with a vast library of programs of ca. 2500 titles.

Productions
Mojto worked for years together with Robert Halmy Sr, with whom he shot the Emmy Award-winning miniseries The Odyssey starring Isabella Rossellini, Geraldine Chaplin and Christopher Lee. Together with Gérard Depardieu, Mojto produced, among other projects, Les Misérables (Family Channel), The Count of Monte Cristo and the 4-part mini-series Napoléon, which was honoured with an Emmy as well as several important German and French Awards.

With EOS Mojto co-produced the acclaimed feature film Downfall directed by Oliver Hirschbiegel and starring Bruno Ganz about the last days of Adolf Hitler. Downfall made the shortlist for the best foreign-language film 2005. Florian Henckel von Donnersmarck's The Lives of Others, one of the highlights in the Beta Cinema portfolio, won the Academy Award (Best Foreign Language) 2007. Among others, EOS co-produced the high ranking HBO-Series Rome, Dresden – The Inferno, the most successful German mini-series ever which has been sold to 95 countries, Side Effects about the thalidomide scandal of the 1950s and 60s and Robert Dornhelm's adaptation of Tolstoi's War and Peace. With Unitel Mojto produced Mozart22, the audiovisuell recording of all Mozart operas at the Salzburg Festival 2006, the opera movie La Bohème with Anna Netrebko und Rolando Villazón, directed by Robert Dornhelm and Beethoven9 with the Vienna Philharmonics and Christian Thielemann.

Other facts 
He is the Great-Uncle of youtuber BaconBoss Gabo

His brother, Pavol, works as a photographer.

External links

http://www.eos-entertainment.com EOS
http://www.betafilm.com Beta Film
http://www.betacinema.com Beta Cinema
http://www.kineos.com Kineos
http://www.betafilm.com/en/unitel.html Unitel
http://www.classica.de Class

1948 births
Living people
Slovak film producers
People from Nitra
INSEAD alumni